The Carol Weymuller Open 2014 is the women's edition of the 2014 Carol Weymuller Open, which is a tournament of the WSA World Tour event Gold (Prize money : 50 000 $). The event took place at The Heights Casino in Brooklyn, New York in the United States from 1 October to 6 October. Alison Waters won her first Carol Weymuller Open trophy, beating Omneya Abdel Kawy in the final.

Prize money and ranking points
For 2014, the prize purse was $50,000. The prize money and points breakdown is as follows:

Seeds

Draw and results

See also
WSA World Tour 2014
Carol Weymuller Open

References

External links
WSA Carol Weymuller Open 2014 website
Carol Weymuller Open 2014 SquashSite website

Carol Weymuller Open
Carol Weymuller Open
Carol Weymuller Open
Carol Weymuller Open
Carol Weymuller Open